Ariel Elías Martínez Arce (born 10 January 1994) is a Chilean footballer who currently plays for Unión La Calera as a midfielder.

References

External links
 

1994 births
Living people
Footballers from Santiago
Chilean footballers
Association football forwards
Chilean Primera División players
Primera B de Chile players
Colo-Colo footballers
Coquimbo Unido footballers
Audax Italiano footballers